Gschwandt is a municipality in the district of Gmunden in the Austrian state of Upper Austria.

Geography
Gschwandt lies in a hilly area with a view on the Traunstein. About 18 percent of the municipality is forest, and 71 percent is farmland.

References

Cities and towns in Gmunden District